Senator Vélez may refer to:

David Cruz Vélez, Senate of Puerto Rico
Jorge Alberto Ramos Vélez, Senate of Puerto Rico